The Virginia Triangle is the commons of Hennepin and Lyndale Avenues on Lowry Hill, Minneapolis in the U.S. state of Minnesota. Until 1967, it was a simple (though congested) intersection, with a small park in the center. By the early 2000s, it contained many on- and off-ramps and a number of large intersections, servicing Hennepin and Lyndale, as well as Interstate 94. Interstate 94 also runs directly under the site, through the Lowry Hill Tunnel. The Walker Art Center and the Basilica of Saint Mary are located adjacent to the Triangle.

References

Geography of Minneapolis
Streets in Minneapolis